Quantum ESPRESSO is a suite for first-principles electronic-structure calculations and materials modeling, distributed for free and as free software under the GNU General Public License. It is based on density-functional theory, plane wave basis sets, and pseudopotentials (both norm-conserving and ultrasoft). ESPRESSO is an acronym for opEn-Source Package for Research in Electronic Structure, Simulation, and Optimization.

The core plane wave DFT functions of QE are provided by the PWscf component (PWscf previously existed as an independent project). PWscf (Plane-Wave Self-Consistent Field) is a set of programs for electronic structure calculations within density functional theory and density functional perturbation theory, using plane wave basis sets and pseudopotentials. The software is released under the GNU General Public License.

The latest version QE-7.1 was released on 16 June 2022.

Quantum ESPRESSO Project 
Quantum ESPRESSO is an open initiative of the CNR-IOM DEMOCRITOS National Simulation Center in Trieste (Italy) and its partners, in collaboration with different centers worldwide such as MIT, Princeton University, the University of Minnesota and the École Polytechnique Fédérale de Lausanne. The project is coordinated by the QUANTUM ESPRESSO foundation, which was formed by many research centers and groups all over the world. The first version, called pw.1.0.0, was released on 15-06-2001.

The program, written mainly in Fortran-90 with some parts in C or in Fortran-77, was built out of the merging and re-engineering of different independently developed core packages, plus a set of packages, designed to be inter-operable with the core components, which allow more advanced tasks to be performed.

The basic packages include Pwscf, which solves the self-consistent Kohn-Sham equations, obtained for a periodic solid, CP to carry out Car-Parrinello molecular dynamics, and PostProc, which allows data analysis and plotting. Regarding the additional packages, is noteworthy to point out atomic for the pseudopotential generation, PHonon package, which implements density-functional perturbation theory (DFPT) for the calculation of second- and third-order derivatives of the energy with respect to atomic displacements, and NEB (nudged elastic band): for the calculation of reaction pathways and energy barriers.

Target problems 
The different tasks that can be performed include
 Ground state calculations
 Structural optimization
 Transition states and minimum energy paths
 Response properties (DFPT), such as phonon frequencies, electron-phonon interactions and EPR and NMR chemical shifts
 Ab initio molecular dynamics: Car-Parrinello and Born-Oppenheimer MD
 Spectroscopic properties
 Quantum import
 Generation of pseudopotentials

Parallelization 
The main components of the Quantum ESPRESSO distribution are designed to exploit the architecture of today's supercomputers characterized by multiple levels and layers of inter-processor communication. The parallelization is achieved using both MPI and OpenMP parallelization, allowing the main codes of the distribution to run in parallel on most or all parallel machines with very good performance.

See also 

 Quantum chemistry computer programs
 Density Functional Theory

References

External links
 Website of Quantum ESPRESSO
 Website of Quantum ESPRESSO Foundation (QEF)

Computational chemistry software
Computational physics
Density functional theory software
Free science software
Physics software